Kuch (also Romanized as Kūch; also known as Kooch Nahar Khan and Kūch-e Now Ferest) is a village in Baqeran Rural District, in the Central District of Birjand County, South Khorasan Province, Iran. At the 2006 census, its population was 104, in 44 families.

References 

Populated places in Birjand County